Ivan De Battista (born 13 September 1977) is a Maltese actor, director, author, and poet/lyricist.

Early life and education
Ivan De Battista was born in Gżira, Malta to Martin and Irene De Battista, the oldest of three brothers. His acting studies included an ATCL Performing and Performer's Certificate in Acting at Trinity College, London, and an intensive Pinnacle Film Acting Course, Curtain Raiser Theatre Group and Bronk Productions Acting Course.

He was awarded a Masters in Marketing by the University of Wales in 2015. He is a member of the Chartered Institute of Marketing, and has a diploma in Management from the University of Leicester.

Career
De Battista appeared on local television in Simpatici (2001), Il-Madonna taċ-Ċoqqa (2002), Mad-daqqa Niżfnu (2004), Id-Driegħ t 'Alla (2005), Santa Monika (2006), Pupi (2007), and Il-Kristu tal-Kerrejja (2008). He also worked in Carabinieri 1, broadcast on Mediaset Italy. After performing the title role in Il-Kristu tal-Kerrejja, he directed the NET Television drama Is-Siġill tal-Qrar, as well as contributing to the editing and writing the lyrics for the end credits. He edited several television documentaries, including Katakombi. 

He had a main role in the four seasons of the television serial F'Salib it-Toroq. He directed four short movies, L-Ittra (The Letter) (2002), for which he also wrote the original score; Dilemma (2003), which won Certificate of Merit – MACC 2003 and 2004; Is-Siġġu ta-Roti (The Wheelchair) (2004); and Self Flattery (2005), which both won third place in Best Production at the National MACC Awards Film Festival.

He directed Season One of the teleseries It-Tfal and the television thriller series, Prima Facie, both for 26th Frame Productions. He also directed the cultural programme Snajja' Maltin, in Seasons One and Two, and the educational programme, Karriera. He directed the first season and directed and produced the second season of the daily soap opera Tereża. He has also directed more than 30 dramatic theatre pieces, in Maltese and in English.

De Battista took part in the Malta Independence Song Festival 2008, singing "Tond jibqa' Tond", and placed third in the Festival in 2009 as both a composer and lyricist of a song sung by newcoming twins Lara and Marie-Elena – "Tar iz-Zmien". He took part in a trio group in IndiFest (2012) with the song "Mhux l-ewwel darba".  In June 2012, De Battista and his wife Simone were selected, along with nine other teams from Europe, to represent Malta at the Tourcoing, France-based 2012 Eurotopiques festival, La Virgule, in a production called Mentior Cum Amori.

He was also a collaborator on the programme Mill-Gnejna Maltija, and has performed in six radio plays. He started a programme called Verset il-Lejl in 2011 along with his wife on a local radio station, which is still airing under the name: Storja flok Siesta.

ImaginArts
De Battista is the director and co-founder (with his wife) of ImaginArts Entertainment Productions and ImaginArts Drama Group, which opened its first classes on 1 August 2010.

Personal life
De Battista married Simone De Battista in 2000 and they have two sons.

Awards
In May 2017, he won Best Teens/Children Programme Award organized by Malta Television Awards 2017 for the educational program Karriera. He was nominated as "Best Actor in a Leading Role – Drama" for his performance in Pupi, organised by the GO Television Awards 2007. He also was nominated for Best Original Soundtrack (Lyrics) for Is-Siġill tal-Qrar, which he directed, organised by the 2010 Vodafone Television Awards.

He won second prize in the Malta Literary Awards for Best Prose for Children for the books Id-Dar ta' Sqaq il-Forka and Il-Milied tal-Angli

Writings
 Irwiefen (Hurricanes) – a book of poetry published in 1999
 Il-Fanal tas-Sinjur (The Master's Lighthouse) – adventure/mystery book published in 2007 and nominated for Best Book for Youngsters
 Id-Dar ta' Sqaq il-Forka (The House in the Gallows' Alley) – adventure/mystery sequel book published in 2009 and won second prize in the Malta Book Awards for Best Prose for Children
 Id tad-Deheb (Golden Hand) – nominated for Best Book for Teens
 Battuti għal Inżul ix-Xemx (Lyrical Beats for Sunset) – an anthology poetry book published in 2010 and nominated for Best Poetry Book
 Il-Qabar tal-Kavallier (The Knight's Tomb) – adventure/mystery book published in 2011 and nominated for Best Book for Youngsters
 Il-Milied tal-Anġli (Christmas of Angels) – adventure book published in 2011 and won second prize in the Malta Book Awards for Best Prose for Children
 L-Aħħar Tlettax (The Last Thirteen) – novel published in 2013
 Il-Misteru tal-Ġgantija (The Ġgantija Mystery) – novel published in 2014 and nominated for Best Book for Teens
 F'Xatt id-Destin (The Beach of Destiny) – novel published in 2018

References

External links

1977 births
Living people
Maltese male stage actors
Maltese male television actors
21st-century Maltese male singers
21st-century Maltese singers
People from Gżira